Pseudotolna is a genus of moths of the family Erebidae. The genus was erected by George Hampson in 1926.

Species
Pseudotolna eximia (Holland, 1894)
Pseudotolna leucomelas Gaede, 1939
Pseudotolna lineosa Laporte, 1973
Pseudotolna perineti Viette, 1965

References

Hampson, George F. (1926). Descriptions of New Genera and Species of Lepidoptera Phalaenae of the Subfamily Noctuinae (Noctuidae) in the British Museum (Natural History).

Calpinae